Afag Masud (b. 3 June 1957, Baku) is an Azerbaijani writer.

Contributions
Born Afag Masud qizi Valiyeva in Baku, Azerbaijan, she became interested in professional writing in her teenage years. She wrote and published her first novel Gargish ("Curse") in 1978, at the age of 21. In the following years, she published 8 more novels as well as numerous short stories, essays and plays. In her works, Masud uses psychologism to emphasize the experiences of her protagonists. She abandons the idea of setting novels in a specific locale pointing out the universal nature of the described issues. Even though almost all of the protagonists in her works are female and the problems dealt with are for the most part gender-specific, Masud disagrees with those who consider her a feminist writer.

She is also famous for translating works by authors such as Franz Kafka, Guy de Maupassant and Gabriel Garcia Marquez into Azeri. She currently works as the editor-in-chief of the Azerbaijani literary magazine Khazar.

List of works
Qarğış
Keçid
Üzü işığa
Cəza
Suiti
Fatma
İzdiham
Azadlıq
II İohann
Yataqxana ("Dormitory", read in English)
The Crash, read in English
The Sparrows, read in English
The death of the Rabbit, read in English

References

 

1957 births
Living people
Azerbaijani women short story writers
Writers from Baku
20th-century Azerbaijani novelists
21st-century Azerbaijani novelists
20th-century Azerbaijani dramatists and playwrights
21st-century Azerbaijani dramatists and playwrights
20th-century Azerbaijani women writers
20th-century Azerbaijani writers
21st-century Azerbaijani women writers
21st-century Azerbaijani writers
Recipients of the Azerbaijan Democratic Republic 100th anniversary medal